Jordan participated in the 16th Asian Games in Guangzhou from 12 November to 27 November 2010.

Medalist

Basketball

Men
Team
Mahd AbdeenKhaldoon Abu RuqayahAbdallah AbuqouraNedal Al SharifAhmad AlhmarahehFadel AlnajjarAli El ZubiMohammad HadrabMohammad HusseinFaisal KhairMalek KhashanAli Jamal Zaghab

Preliminary round

Group E

Quarterfinals

Placings 5th–8th

Placings 7th–8th

Boxing

Board games

Chess

Fencing

Men

Football

Men
Team
Mohammad Abu KhousaAhmad Abu SamrahKhaldoun Al-KizamYusuf Al-NaberMohammad MustafaAnas Al-JbaratSaleh Al-JawhariAhmad AllYasser Al-RawashdehYusuf Al-ThudanKhalil Bani AttiahMohammad FatmaZaid JaberYusuf Al-RawashdehFeras SalehAhmad ShaalanMohammad Omar ShishaniOday ZahranMahmoud Za'taraIbrahim Al-Zawahreh

Pool matches

Group C

Women
Team
Alaa Abu KashehFarah Al BadarnehAyah Al-MajaliFarah AlazabEnshirah Al-HyasatManal AlmanasrehStephanie Al-NaberAbeer Al-NaharAla AlqrainiMaysa JbarahShahnaz JebreenYasmeen KhairSama'a KhraisatZaina PetroMisda RamouniehShorooq ShathliMira Zakaria

Pool matches

Group A

Karate

Men

Women

Squash

Swimming

Men

Taekwondo

Men

Women

Wrestling

Men
Greco-Roman
{| class="wikitable" border="1" style="font-size:90%"
|-
!rowspan=2|Athlete
!rowspan=2|Event
!Round of 16
!Quarterfinals
!Semifinals
!Final
|-
!OppositionResult
!OppositionResult
!OppositionResult
!OppositionResult
|-
|Yahia Abu-Tabeekh
|96 kg
|align=center|BYE
|align=center|W VT 5-0
|align=center|L PO 0-'3
|align=center|Bronze medal match:L PO 0-3
|-
|Hani Al-Marafy
|120 kg
|align=center|W PO 3-0
|align=center|L PO 0-3|align=center|Bronze medal match:''L PP 1-3|}

Wushu

MenSanshou'''

Nations at the 2010 Asian Games
2010
Asian Games